is a Japanese composer, arranger and guitarist. He has composed the soundtrack for several anime series, including Nisekoi, Eromanga Sensei and Higehiro. He is represented by the music production company POPHOLIC.

Biography
Kikuya was born in Tokyo, in 1968. His mother was a piano teacher, so he has had contact with music since an early age. He started his musician career in 1992, when in college, as a member of the rock band Mustang A.K.A., which lasted for two years. Later, he worked as a guitarist in the band Funanori. After that, besides guitar, he learned a wide range of musical instruments.

In 2005, after joining POPHOLIC, Kikuya made his debut as a composer in the anime Tona-Gura!. Since then, he has been active as a songwriter, providing the scores for anime series, as well as elaborating music to artists.

Works

References

External links
  
 Tomoki Kikuya's Personal Blog 
 Tomoki Kikuya discography at VGMdb
 
 

1968 births
Anime composers
Japanese film score composers
Japanese male film score composers
Japanese male musicians
Japanese music arrangers
Living people
Musicians from Tokyo